Adalberto Cardoso (21 December 1905 – 11 January 1972) was a Brazilian long-distance runner. He competed in the men's 10,000 metres at the 1932 Summer Olympics.

References

External links
 

1905 births
1972 deaths
Athletes (track and field) at the 1932 Summer Olympics
Brazilian male long-distance runners
Olympic athletes of Brazil
Place of birth missing